Luuk Koopmans (born 18 November 1993) is a Dutch professional footballer who plays as a goalkeeper for Eerste Divisie club ADO Den Haag. He formerly played for Oss '20, NEC, FC Oss, MVV Maastricht, and PSV.

Early life
Koopmans was born on 18 November 1993 in Oss.

Club career
On 28 October 2020, Koopmans scored in extra time in a KNVB Beker match against Sparta Rotterdam at an empty Cars Jeans Stadion. In doing so, Koopmans became the first ADO goalkeeper to score from the run of play since Martin Hansen scored against PSV Eindhoven in 2015 in an Eredivisie match.

Career statistics

Honours

Club
PSV
Eredivisie: 2015–16
Johan Cruyff Shield: 2016

External links
 
 Voetbal International profile

References

1993 births
Living people
Dutch footballers
NEC Nijmegen players
TOP Oss players
PSV Eindhoven players
MVV Maastricht players
ADO Den Haag players
Eredivisie players
Eerste Divisie players
Sportspeople from Oss
Association football goalkeepers
Footballers from North Brabant
21st-century Dutch people